Julien Taramarcaz (born 12 November 1987) is a former professional cyclo-cross and road cyclist from Switzerland.

Major results

Cyclo-cross

2003–2004
 2nd National Junior Championships
2004–2005
 1st  UEC European Junior Championships
 1st  National Junior Championships
 2nd  UCI Junior World Championships
 3rd Overall UCI Junior World Cup
1st Wetzikon
2005–2006
 3rd National Under-23 Championships
2006–2007
 3rd National Under-23 Championships
2007–2008
 Under-23 Superprestige
1st Veghel-Eerde
 2nd National Under-23 Championships
2008–2009
 1st  National Under-23 Championships
2010–2011
 3rd National Championships
 3rd GP 5 Sterne Region
 3rd Internationales Radquer Dagmersellen
2011–2012
 1st  National Championships
 1st Rennaz
2012–2013
 1st  National Championships
 1st Radcross Illnau
 2nd Kasteelcross Zonnebeke
 6th UCI World Championships
2013–2014
 1st Cyclo-cross International Sion-Valais
2014–2015
 1st  National Championships
 3rd Cyclo-cross International de Nommay
2015–2016
 2nd National Championships
 3rd Kermiscross
2016–2017
 1st  National Championships
 1st Cyclocross International Sion-Valais

Road
2005
 National Junior Road Championships
1st  Road race
2nd Time trial
2014
 3rd

References

External links

1987 births
Living people
Swiss male cyclists
Cyclo-cross cyclists
UCI Cyclo-cross World Champions (men)
Sportspeople from Valais